Littlemoss is a suburb of Droylsden, in the Tameside District, in the English county of Greater Manchester.

Littlemoss village is predominantly a farming area comprising Cinderland Hall Farm (dating back to the 17th century), Buckley Hill Farm, Willow Bank Farm, Jaum Farm and Gravel Hill Farm and a few others.  It  comprises mainly Lumb Lane, Back Lane, Cross Lane, Andrew Street, Hyde Street, Wayne Close, Brookside Close, Brookland and Woodleigh and Wayne Close and The Stables Estate and the Maunder's estate.

History
Littlemoss used to have about four shops and two public houses and a post office, which were eventually converted to houses.  There was also a Co-op, which later became an antique shop before being converted into apartments.

In the 1970s proposals were made to build houses on the land, but a petition was raised and many signatures obtained, so subsequently, and thankfully, saving the green fields from this fate.

In 1977, the Queen's Silver Jubilee was celebrated on the public playing field off Andrew Street, with a gala and fair, with donkey cart rides provided by Reg Cook from Cinderland Hall Farm, who still resided there in 2013, with his wife, Margaret.

In around the year 2000, the M60 Manchester ring road motorway was completed, cutting through Littlemoss, to which a fair amount of grazing land and some properties were lost, including the 'Army Camp' which had been converted into stables and horse grazing.  Several buildings including the 'back to front houses' off Lumb Lane, were also demolished at this time.

The Littlemoss Boys' School was demolished in 2012 and by 2013 the school playing field was used for grazing cattle. There were proposals to build more houses on the site, despite lack of support from residents.

Amenities 
Littlemoss has a high school called Littlemoss High School.

References 

 A-Z Greater Manchester (page 104)

Areas of Greater Manchester
Droylsden